Jeon Jong-hyuk (born 21 March 1996) is a South Korean footballer who plays as goalkeeper for Busan IPark in K League 2.

References

1996 births
Living people
Association football goalkeepers
South Korean footballers
Seongnam FC players
Bucheon FC 1995 players
Busan IPark players
K League 2 players
K League 1 players
People from Seongnam
Sportspeople from Gyeonggi Province
21st-century South Korean people